Y Graig, three miles west of Abergavenny, is the site of an abandoned settlement, known to have been occupied in the 18th and 19th centuries. It is a scheduled monument in the care of Cadw.

See also
Sugar Loaf, Monmouthshire

References
Flickr photo gallery of Y Graig

Abandoned Communities: Y Graig

Former populated places in Wales